Fernando Marroquin (born 1919, date of death unknown) was a Guatemalan cyclist. He competed in the 4,000 metres team pursuit at the 1952 Summer Olympics.

References

1919 births
Year of death missing
Guatemalan male cyclists
Olympic cyclists of Guatemala
Cyclists at the 1952 Summer Olympics